Pao cambodgiensis is a species of freshwater pufferfish native to the Mekong basin. It is also recorded from Dong Nai River. This species grows to a length of  SL.

References

Tetraodontidae
Fish of the Mekong Basin
Fish of Cambodia
Fish of Laos
Fish of Thailand
Fish of Vietnam
Fish described in 1923
Taxa named by Paul Chabanaud